The England cricket team represented England, Scotland and Wales in Test cricket. Between 1920 and 1939, when competitive cricket was interrupted by the Second World War, England played 120 Test matches, resulting in 41 victories, 49 draws and 30 defeats. During this period, England faced India, New Zealand and the West Indies for the first time in Test cricket, having previously only played against Australia and South Africa. The emergence of Don Bradman as an extraordinary batsman for Australia led to England employing Bodyline tactics during the 1932–33 Ashes tour of Australia. The tactic, which involved bowling fast deliveries aimed at the batsman, created antagonism between the two teams. The England team of the era featured some of the country's best batsmen; Jack Hobbs, Wally Hammond and Len Hutton were all included in the ESPNcricinfo "all-time England XI" in 2009.

England faced Australia most frequently during this period—playing 49 matches against them—followed by South Africa. England won more matches than they lost against every team except Australia, against whom they won 15 matches and lost 22. They did not lose any matches against newcomers India or New Zealand, while against the West Indies they won 8 matches and lost 3. England won 14 matches by an innings, with their largest victory being by an innings and 579 runs against Australia during the 1938 Ashes series, the largest margin of victory by any team in Test cricket. Their largest victory by runs alone during this period was in the 1928–29 Ashes series against Australia, when they won by 675 runs, which is also an all-time record for any team, while they won by ten wickets on two occasions. Conversely, England suffered their largest defeat by runs alone, losing to Australia by 562 runs during the 1934 Ashes series, which ranks behind England's 675 runs victory as the second highest margin of victory by runs.

Key

Matches

Summary

Notes

References

England in international cricket
England Test
Test